Coeranus or Koiranos may refer to:

Coeranus (mythology) various
Coeranus of Beroea Macedonian officer
Coeranus of Miletus saved by a dolphin after a shipwreck